Arlette Mafuta Maluvuidi (born 3 September 1989), known as Arlette Mafuta, is a DR Congolese footballer who plays as a midfielder. She has been a member of the DR Congo women's national team.

International career
Mafuta capped for the DR Congo at senior level during the 2012 African Women's Championship.

See also
 List of Democratic Republic of the Congo women's international footballers

References

External links

1989 births
Living people
Footballers from Kinshasa
Democratic Republic of the Congo women's footballers
Women's association football midfielders
Democratic Republic of the Congo women's international footballers
21st-century Democratic Republic of the Congo people